is a badminton player from Japan.

She competed in badminton at the 2004 Summer Olympics in women's doubles with partner Seiko Yamada.  They were defeated by Chin Eei Hui and Wong Pei Tty of Malaysia in the round of 32.

Yamamoto also competed in mixed doubles with partner Tadashi Ohtsuka.  They were defeated in the round of 32 by Robert Blair and Natalie Munt of Great Britain.

External links

2004 Japanese Olympic Committee

1975 births
Living people
Japanese female badminton players
Olympic badminton players of Japan
Badminton players at the 2004 Summer Olympics
Badminton players at the 2002 Asian Games
Asian Games competitors for Japan